Andrew Koloszuk (born October 22, 1967), better known by the ring name Baby Gorilla Andrew Anderson, is an American professional wrestler, promoter, actor and author. Koloszuk is currently working the independent circuit performing in matches for East Coast Professional Wrestling (ECPW), Southwest Wrestling Entertainment (SWE) and Ultimate Championship Wrestling (UCW). Koloszuk is co-founder of Tri-State Wrestling Alliance(formerly National Wrestling Alliance (NWA) Big Apple).

Professional wrestling career

Early career (1993–1999)
Koloszuk began his career in 1993, He was discovered by WWE Hall of Famer Jimmy Snuka and "Metal Maniac" Jeff Miller. Initially Koloszuk was trained by Jimmy Snuka and Gino Caruso at Caruso's East Coast Pro Wrestling(ECPW) gym in Lake Hiawatha, New Jersey. Koloszuk was later trained by Kodiak Bear, Mike Masters, Nikolai Volkoff, and Jerry Fazio. From 1993 to 1999 Koloszuk performed in various independent wrestling companies across the United States, including Jersey All Pro Wrestling (JAPW), Pennsylvania Championship Wrestling (PCW) and Hawaiian Islands Wrestling Federation (HIWF). In 1997, Koloszuk wrestled under the ring name The Siberian Tiger a name he adopted while working as a tag team with Nikolai Volkoff. Koloszuk, was frequently managed throughout his career by; Captain Lou Albano, Godfather Joey G, Doug Devito, Roddy Piper, Mr. Big John Whol, and Nigel Rabid.

Becoming an Anderson
Angelo Savoldi, at the time a wrestling promoter, influenced Koloszuk to change his ring name. Savoldi thought that Koloszuk looked like a baby gorilla Arn Anderson so Koloszuk started wrestling as Andrew Anderson.

Jersey Championship Wrestling (2000–2002)
In early 2000 Koloszuk began performing for Jersey Championship Wrestling. On April 14, 2000, taping an episode of Jersey Championship Wrestling, Anderson defeated Nick Maddox in a tournament final to become the inaugural JCW Heavyweight Champion. Eight days later on April 22, 2000, Anderson is defeated by Low Ki, losing the JCW Heavyweight Championship title.

East Coast Professional Wrestling (2005 – Current)
Anderson began performing for East Coast Professional Wrestling (ECPW) in 2005. ECPW is owned by Gino Caruso, one of the men who trained Anderson. During his time with ECPW, Anderson has become a 4 time ECPW Heavyweight Champion, an ECPW Television Champion and an ECPW Tag Team Champion with The Pub Bully twice.

United Pro Wrestling Association (2006–2007)
Between mid 2006 and mid 2007 Anderson performed in matches for United Pro Wrestling Association (UPWA).

Pro Wrestling 225 (2019)
On July 21, 2019, at the Pro Wrestling 225 event Collision Course Anderson teamed with Mustang Mike defeated The Cajun Outlawz C-Thang & Rhett The Threat to become the PW225 Tag Team Champions. The reign lasted for 45 days before the titles were vacated.

Tri-State Wrestling Alliance (2016 – Current)
Anderson co-founded National Wrestling Alliance (NWA) Big Apple in 2016. In 2017 the company cut ties with NWA and the name was changed to Tri-State Wrestling Alliance (TSWA).

Southwest Wrestling Entertainment (2020–2020)
In early 2020 Anderson began performing in matches for Southwest Wrestling Entertainment (SWE).

Ultimate Championship Wrestling (2021 – Current)
Anderson is currently the UCW Warfare Heavyweight Champion, in 2022 Anderson is set to make his debut for World Pro Wrestling in the United Kingdom. Anderson took on James Mason at Cheltenham Town Hall for World Pro Wrestling on Saturday February 19.

Acting career
Koloszuk also pursued a career in acting, appearing in both film and television.

Koloszuk plays the role of the character Fernando in the 2004 Spike Lee Showtime television film "Sucker Free City".

Koloszuk was an extra in the 2008 American sports drama film "The Wrestler".

Koloszuk has also starred in commercials for Doritos and Skittles.

Writing career
Koloszuk is the author of his upcoming autobiography, "It's Really Not My Fault".

Personal life

Although he was billed as such Koloszuk is not related to Arn Anderson or any other members of the Anderson family.

Koloszuk graduated from St. Peter's College in Jersey City, New Jersey in 1989 with a degree in business administration and a BA in marketing management.

Koloszuk has 2 daughters, Olivia and Hope.

Filmography

Championships and accomplishments
 Cauliflower Alley Club
 Men's Wrestling Award (2019)
 Champion Wrestling Federation
 CWF Heavyweight Champion (2 times)
 CyberSpace Wrestling Federation
 CyberSpace Tag Team Champion (1 time, inaugural) with Billy Firehawk
 East Coast Professional Wrestling
 ECPW Tri-State Brass Knuckle Championship (1 time)
 ECPW Heavyweight Championship (4 times)
 ECPW Television Championship (1 time)
 ECPW Tag Team Championship (2 times) with The Pub Bully
 Gulf State Wrestling
 GSW Tag Team Championship (1 time with Mustang Mike
 GSW Louisiana Heavyweight Champion (1 time)
 Jersey Championship Wrestling
 JCW Heavyweight Championship (1 time, inaugural)
 Pro Wrestling 225
 PW225 Tag Team Championship (1 time) with Mustang Mike
 Renegade Wrestling Alliance
 RWA Heavyweight Championship (1 time)
 Tri-State Wrestling Alliance
 TSWA Heavyweight Championship (1 time, current)
 Ultimate Championship Wrestling
 Warfare Heavyweight Champion (1 time, current)

References

External links

1967 births
21st-century American male actors
American male film actors
American male television actors
American male professional wrestlers
Anderson family
Living people
Male actors from New Jersey
People from Cliffside Park, New Jersey
People from Ridgefield, New Jersey
Professional wrestlers from New Jersey
Professional wrestling trainers
Sportspeople from New Jersey